Marine Air Control Squadron 2 (MACS-2) is a United States Marine Corps aviation command and control squadron. The squadron provides aerial surveillance, Ground-controlled interception, and air traffic control for the II Marine Expeditionary Force. They are based at Marine Corps Air Station Cherry Point and fall under Marine Air Control Group 28 and the 2nd Marine Aircraft Wing.

Mission
Detect, identify and control the intercept of hostile aircraft and missiles, and provide navigational assistance to friendly aircraft and provide continuous all-weather, radar, non-radar approach, departure, en route and tower air traffic control services to friendly aircraft.

The unit manages anti-air warfare assets within assigned sector. It detects, identifies and classifies all aircraft within its assigned sector. It maintain tracks of identified contacts and provide en route control/navigation assistance as required. MACS-2 selects and assign weapons to engage and defeat enemy air threats. It controls the engagement of enemy air threats by increasing interceptors or surface-to-air weapons. It provides radar/non-radar approach, departure and en route air traffic control services within assigned terminal control areas. It provides automatic carrier landing system approach services (Modes I, II, and III) for forward operating bases. Finally it coordinates air defense activities within designated base defense zones.

Primary Missions
Air Traffic Control
Early Warning & Control
Air Intercept Control
Mutil-TADIL interface and management

Subordinate units

History

World War II
Marine Air Warning Squadron 11 was commissioned on 1 April 1944 at Marine Corps Air Station Cherry Point, North Carolina, and was under the command of Marine Air Warning Group 1, 9th Marine Aircraft Wing.  In June 1944, the squadron relocated to Marine Corps Air Station Miramar, California and was assigned to Marine Air Warning Group 2. In March 1945, the squadron relocated once again, this time assigned to the 3rd Marine Aircraft Wing at Pearl Harbor, Territory of Hawaii. The squadron left Hawaii in late May 1945 and arrived at Okinawa on 4 July 1945.   On 17 July AWS-11 was moved to Kume Shima and was joined to Marine Aircraft Group 43 of the 2nd Marine Aircraft Wing.  The squadron remained there until after the surrender of Japan.

In October 1945, the squadron moved viz LSTsto Tsingtao, China to join Marine Aircraft Group 24, 1st Marine Aircraft Wing, and participated in the occupation of Northern China until May 1946. Proceeding from North China, the Squadron moved once again to Miramar, California and in August 1946, it was redesignated as Marine Ground Control Intercept Squadron 2, a member of Marine Air Warning Group 2, where it remained until its deactivation on 15 October 1947.

Reactivation and movement to Hawaii

During the buildup to the Korean War, Marine Ground Control Intercept Squadron 2 was reactivated in El Toro, California on 3 August 1950. In January 1952, the squadron was attached to Marine Aircraft Group 13 and two months later moved with MAG-13 to Kaneohe Bay, Territory of Hawaii. On 15 February 1954, the Squadron was redesignated as Marine Air Control Squadron 2, and four years later in November 1958, relocated to Atsugi, Japan. In March 1959, MACS-2 joined the First Marine Brigade and returned to Kaneohe Bay, Hawaii.

On May 19, 1962, elements of MACS-2 deployed to Udorn Royal Thai Air Force Base, Thailand as part of a buildup of US forces in Thailand in response to the worsening situation of the Royal Lao Government in the Laotian Civil War.  In July 1962 the squadron's elements received orders to depart Thailand.  They travelled via rail to Bangkock and departed Thailand via United States Navy shipping.

Desert Shield/Desert Storm

In August 1990, MACS-2 received orders to deploy to Southwest Asia in support of Operation Desert Shield, and on 6 September 1990, arrived in Saudi Arabia. Establishing a Tactical Air Operations Center (TAOC) in the vicinity of King Abdul Aziz Naval Base (KAANB), MACS-2 provided a base defense zone for KAANB and the port of Jubail. On 29 December 1990, MACS-2 displaced to Ras Mishab port, harbor, and airfield complex, establishing the primary TAOC eight miles west, to provide anti-air warfare capabilities in support of MARCENT and I Marine Expeditionary Force air and ground operations. During Operation Desert Storm in February 1991, an Early Warning and Control (EW/C) site deployed with the ground combat element through the breach to Ahmad al-Jaber Air Base in the Kingdom of Kuwait. Upon cessation of hostilities, MACS-2 was redeployed to MCAS Kaneohe Bay, Hawaii in March 1991, in support of Marine Aircraft Group 24, 1st Marine Expeditionary Brigade.

Leaving Hawaii and varied operations
In 1993, MACS-2 was disbanded in Hawaii and MACS-5 at the Marine Corps Air Station Beaufort, South Carolina was redesignated as MACS-2, subordinate to Marine Aircraft Group 31 (MAG-31). While supporting MAG-31 in 1994, MACS-2 acquired Air Traffic Control (ATC) Detachments A and B. Between 1995 and 1998, MACS-2 participated in Joint Task Force Six, also known as Operation Lone Star, a drug interdiction operation patrolling the Mexico–United States border. Further drug interdiction operations included EC-7 in 1996 in Ecuador and Operation Laser Strike in 1997 conducted in Peru. ATC detachments C and D joined MACS-2 in 1998.

MACS-2 relocated once more to MCAS Cherry Point in 1998 under Marine Air Control Group 28 where it resides today. Deployed in support of overseas operations, MACS-2 sent an ATC detachment known as a Marine Air Traffic Control Mobile Team (MMT) to Kosovo with the 26th Marine Expeditionary Unit in 1999. In support of operations in Serbia, MACS-2 deployed an MMT to Hungary, also in 1999. In 2001, MACS-2 sent Tactical Air Operations Center Marines to Southwest Asia to support the United States Air Force in Operation Southern Watch. The squadron also provided an ATC detachment to the 2002 Winter Olympics in Salt Lake City, Utah.

Wars in Iraq and Afghanistan

In early 2003 MACS-2 sent a detachment of over 50 Marines to support the initial phase of Operation Iraqi Freedom. Consisting mostly of Six-man Mobile Air Traffic Control Teams (MMT, the Marines of MACS-2 were instrumental in providing operational capability for Forward Arming and Refueling Points (FARPs) and Forward Air Bases (FOBs), ensuring air superiority for the coalition forces from the Kuwait border through Baghdad and as far north as Tikrit. An MMT team attached to MWSS-371 took part in the Battle of Ah Nasiriyah from 26 to 29 March 2003, with one air traffic control sustaining shrapnel wounds that earned him a purple heart.

A detachment from Marine Air Control Squadron 2 make up the Air Traffic Control Detachment at Djibouti-Ambouli International Airport in support of Combined Joint Task Force - Horn of Africa in early 2003. Members of the detachment work with Djiboutian and French air traffic controllers in the control tower to ensure military and civilian aircraft land and take off safely at the airport. Marines served as the liaison between the American pilots and the French and Djiboutian controllers.

From 2009 through 2014, MACS-2, in concert with MACS-1, supported sustained TAOC operations at Camp Leatherneck, in Helmand Province, Afghanistan. MACS-2 first brought the TAOC and AN/TPS-59 radar into Helmand Province in 2009 replacing the Royal Air Force's No. 1 Air Control Centre.  These units were responsible for controlling 70,000 square miles of airspace in support of Regional Command Southwest operations. From 2009 through 2014, both MACS-1 and MACS-2 coordinated more than 320,000 fixed-wing operations, 80,000 aerial refueling operations, and more than 7,000 rotary wing operations.  The TAOC's mission in Afghanistan ended in November 2013 as the Marine Corps withdrew its presence in Southern Afghanistan and turned over control of the area to United States Air Force's 71st Expeditionary Air Control Squadron.

Unit awards
A unit citation or commendation is an award bestowed upon an organization for the action cited. Members of the unit who participated in said actions are allowed to wear on their uniforms the awarded unit citation. Marine Air Control Squadron 2 has been presented with the following awards:

See also
 United States Marine Corps Aviation
 List of United States Marine Corps aviation support units

Citations

References
Bibliography

Web

 Marine Corps Warfighting Publication 3–25.7. Retrieved on 2007-01-18.
 GlobalSecurity.org – MACS-2 History Retrieved on 2008-08-15

See also
 MACS-2’s official website. Retrieved on 28 May 2020.

Radar